Hølonda is a former municipality in the old Sør-Trøndelag county, Norway. The  municipality existed from 1865 until its dissolution in 1964. Hølonda encompassed the southwestern part of what is now the municipality of Melhus in Trøndelag county. The municipality was west of the river Gaula. The administrative centre was the village of Korsvegen. The main church for the municipality was Hølonda Church, near Gåsbakken.

History

The municipality of Høilandet (later changed to Hølonda) was established in 1865 when it was separated from the old municipality of Melhus. The new municipality had an initial population of 1,818. During the 1960s, there were many municipal mergers across Norway due to the work of the Schei Committee. On 1 January 1964, the neighboring municipalities of Hølonda (population: 1,428), Horg (population: 2,560), Flå (population: 843), Melhus (population: 3,978), and the Langørgen farm (population: 11) in Buvik were all merged to form a new, larger municipality of Melhus.

Name
The municipality (originally the parish) is named Hølonda. Prior to 1889, the name was written Høilandet, then from 1889 until 1931 it was written Hølandet, and then from 1932 until its dissolution in 1964, it was spelled Hølonda.

Government
While it existed, this municipality was responsible for primary education (through 10th grade), outpatient health services, senior citizen services, unemployment, social services, zoning, economic development, and municipal roads. During its existence, this municipality was governed by a municipal council of elected representatives, which in turn elected a mayor.

Municipal council
The municipal council  of Hølonda was made up of 17 representatives that were elected to four year terms. The party breakdown of the final municipal council was as follows:

Mayors
The mayors of Hølonda:

 1859–1864: Anders Nilsen Krogstad
 1864–1872: Ole Andersen Røe
 1872–1882: Anders Flå
 1882–1883: Even Evensen Myhren
 1884–1887: Thore Johnsen Thonstad
 1887–1887: Steffen Andersen Røe
 1888–1891: Rasmus Rasmussen Gaustad (H)
 1892–1898: Ole O. Krogstad
 1899–1913: Kristen Olsen Kulbrandstad (V)
 1914–1916: Halvor J. Restad
 1917–1925: John L. Konstad (Bp)
 1926–1931: Ola Øyen (V)
 1932–1937: John L. Konstad (Bp)
 1938–1940: Erik Sundseth (V)
 1940–1941: Ottar Moe (NS)
 1942–1942: Hans Bollingmo (NS)
 1942–1945: Konrad S. Gaustad (NS)
 1945-1945: Martin Rasmussen Gaustad (LL)
 1946–1951: Sivert Johnsen Almås (V)
 1952–1963: Konrad Blokkum (V)

See also
List of former municipalities of Norway

References

Melhus
Former municipalities of Norway
1865 establishments in Norway
1964 disestablishments in Norway